Giuseppe Battiston (born 22 July 1968) is an Italian actor. He has appeared in more than 50 films since 1990.

Filmography

Film

Television

References

External links 
 

1968 births
Living people
Italian male actors
People from Udine
Nastro d'Argento winners
Ciak d'oro winners
David di Donatello winners